Carlos Francisco Carvalho Falé, known as Falé (born 11 June 1933) is a former Portuguese football player.

He played 14 seasons and 271 games in the Primeira Liga for Lusitano de Évora.

Club career
He made his Primeira Liga debut for Lusitano de Évora on 28 December 1952 in a game against Barreirense.

References

1952 births
Living people
Portuguese footballers
Lusitano G.C. players
União Montemor players
Primeira Liga players
Association football defenders
Sportspeople from Évora District